The Musée de l'Éventail (Fan Museum), or more formally L'Atelier Hoguet Musée de l'Éventail, is a private museum of fans and fan-making located in the 10th arrondissement at 2, boulevard de Strasbourg, Paris, France. It is open several afternoons per week (Monday, Tuesday and Wednesday) and is closed annually during the month of August; an admission fee is charged. The nearest métro station is Strasbourg – Saint-Denis.

The museum is located within the Atelier Anne Hoguet, a workshop for fan-making and restoration. Its exhibits are displayed in a showroom established in 1893 by fan-makers Lepault & Deberghe, purchased in 1960 by Hervé Hoguet. The museum was established in 1993.

Today the museum is housed within two rooms. The former showroom is furnished in Henry II style with a monumental fireplace, three chandeliers, blue walls embroidered with fleur-de-lys in gold thread, and walnut furnishings. It contains an exhibition of fans from the eighteenth century to the present day, along with the tools, workbenches, and materials used in making fans, including mother-of-pearl, ivory, horn, bone, and wood.

See also 
 List of museums in Paris

References 
 

Additional sources

 Musée de l'Éventail
 Dentellieres article (French)
 Paris.org entry
 Museums of Paris entry
 Paris Info entry

Museums in Paris
Buildings and structures in the 10th arrondissement of Paris
Fashion museums in France
Museums established in 1993
1993 establishments in France